Pristurus gallagheri, also known as Gallagher's rock gecko or Wadi Kharrar rock gecko , is a species of lizard in the family Sphaerodactylidae found in Oman.

References

Pristurus
Reptiles described in 1986